There are several groups of Forty-Nine Martyrs venerated as saints in Christianity:

Martyrs of Abitinae (304), Roman Catholic
Forty-nine companions of Callistratus of Carthage (303×313), Roman Catholic and Eastern Orthodox
Forty-Nine Martyrs of Scetis (444), Oriental Orthodox
Sadok and 48 Dominican martyrs from Sandomierz (1260), Roman Catholic